Herve is a city and municipality of Wallonia located in the province of Liège, Belgium. On January 1, 2018 Herve had a total population of 17,598.

It is famed for its Herve cheese.

Municipal merger 

Herve is currently constituted of 11 villages: Battice, Bolland, Bruyères, Chaineux, Charneux, Grand-Rechain, Herve, José, Julémont, Manaihant, Xhendelesse.

There are a number of smaller villages in the Herve region, such as Hacboister (district of Bolland).

Architecture 
 The Church of St John the Baptist: built in the 17th century. The bell tower is a distinctively crooked spire, in order to offer better resistance to the wind. The church was classed as a historic monument in 1934.
 Château de Bolland: a mediaeval château largely rebuilt in the 17th century

See also
 List of protected heritage sites in Herve

References

External links
 
 Ville de Herve - official site

 
Cities in Wallonia
Municipalities of Liège Province